Stade Olympique de la Pontaise is a multi-purpose stadium in Lausanne, Switzerland. The stadium holds 15,700 people and was opened in 1954.

The stadium is used primarily for football matches. It is currently the home ground of FC Stade Lausanne Ouchy, of the Swiss Challenge League.

The stadium also hosts the Diamond League event, the Athletissima.

Events 

During the 1954 FIFA World Cup, the stadium hosted five games.

Pink Floyd have performed two concerts at the stadium. On 12 July 1989, as part of their A Momentary Lapse of Reason Tour and on 25 September 1994, as part of their The Division Bell Tour.

Michael Jackson performed at the stadium during his "Bad" World Tour on 19 August 1988, during his "Dangerous" World Tour on 8 September 1992 and during his HIStory World Tour on 20 June 1997.

In 2011, the stadium hosted some events of the World Gymnaestrada.

International matches

See also 

 Stade Pierre de Coubertin (another stadium of Lausanne)

References

Pontaise
1954 FIFA World Cup stadiums
Sports venues in Lausanne
Athletics (track and field) venues in Switzerland
Multi-purpose stadiums in Switzerland
Tourist attractions in the canton of Vaud
Diamond League venues
Sports venues completed in 1954
1954 establishments in Switzerland
20th-century architecture in Switzerland